This is an index for the list of films produced in mainland China ordered by decade on separate pages. For an alphabetical listing of Chinese films see :Category:Chinese films

1905–1989
List of Chinese films before 1930
List of Chinese films of the 1930s
List of Chinese films of the 1940s
List of Chinese films of the 1950s
List of Chinese films of the 1960s
List of Chinese films of the 1970s
List of Chinese films of the 1980s
List of Chinese films of the 1990s

1990s
List of Chinese films of 1990
List of Chinese films of 1991
List of Chinese films of 1992
List of Chinese films of 1993
List of Chinese films of 1994
List of Chinese films of 1995
List of Chinese films of 1996
List of Chinese films of 1997
List of Chinese films of 1998
List of Chinese films of 1999

2000s
List of Chinese films of 2000
List of Chinese films of 2001
List of Chinese films of 2002
List of Chinese films of 2003
List of Chinese films of 2004
List of Chinese films of 2005
List of Chinese films of 2006
List of Chinese films of 2007
List of Chinese films of 2008
List of Chinese films of 2009

2010s
 List of Chinese films of 2010
 List of Chinese films of 2011
 List of Chinese films of 2012
 List of Chinese films of 2013
 List of Chinese films of 2014
 List of Chinese films of 2015
 List of Chinese films of 2016
 List of Chinese films of 2017
 List of Chinese films of 2018
 List of Chinese films of 2019

2020s
List of Chinese films of 2020
List of Chinese films of 2021
List of Chinese films of 2022

See also
Cinema of China
Best 100 Chinese Motion Pictures as chosen by the 24th Hong Kong Film Awards

External links
IMDB list of Chinese films by year
100 Greatest Chinese language films chosen by Asia Weekly Magazine
100 Best Mainland Chinese Films chosen by 88 experts and organised by Time Out Beijing and Time Out Shanghai.

zh:中国大陆电影